Dato' Sri Mustapa bin Mohamed (Jawi: مصطفى بن محمد; born 25 September 1950), commonly known as Tok Pa among local Kelantanese, is a Malaysian politician who served as the Minister in the Prime Minister's Department for Economic Affairs for third term in the Barisan Nasional (BN) administration under former Prime Minister Ismail Sabri Yaakob from August 2021 to the collapse of the BN administration in November 2022, second term in the Perikatan Nasional (PN) administration under former Prime Minister Muhyiddin Yassin from March 2020 to August 2021 and first term in the BN administration under former Prime Minister Abdullah Ahmad Badawi from March 2004 to February 2006 and the Member of Parliament (MP) for Jeli from March 2004 to November 2022. He is member of the Malaysian United Indigenous Party (BERSATU), a component party of the Perikatan Nasional (PN) and formerly Pakatan Harapan (PH) coalitions and was a member of the United Malays National Organisation (UMNO), a component party of the BN coalition. He left UMNO for BERSATU in 2018.

Early education and career
Mustapa went to Sultan Ismail College, Kota Bharu and graduated from the University of Melbourne, Australia, with a First Class Honours degree in Economics and from Boston University with a Masters in Economic Development. He is an economist.

Political career

Mustapa was elected to Parliament in the 1995 election for Jeli constituency, but was defeated for re-election in 1999. He won back the seat in the 2004 election. In 2004 he was also elected to the Kelantan State Legislative Assembly for the Air Lanas seat. He had been slated to become Chief Minister of Kelantan but BN failed to win a majority in the state Assembly. He was re-elected in 2008 election. In 2004 election, he retained his parliamentary seat and again won the state seat of Air Lanas concurrently but with a slim 47 votes.

Mustapa was the former Minister for International Trade and Industry in the BN federal government. Previously, he has also held a number of other government portfolios, including Deputy Finance Minister, Minister for Entrepreneur Development, Minister in the Prime Minister's Department, Minister for Higher Education, and Minister for Agriculture and Agro-based Industry. He was appointed to the Trade portfolio when Najib Razak became Prime Minister in April 2009.

In the aftermath of BN's loss in the 2018 election and UMNO's own party election, Mustapa announced on 18 September 2018 that he has quit UMNO, citing disagreements with the party's current direction. On the 27 October 2018, Mustapa joined BERSATU.

On 4 December 2018, Mustapa was elected chair of the Budget Select Committee.

Personal life
Mustapa is married to Khamarzan Ahmad Meah and the couple has four children.

In January 2021, Mustapa was tested positive for COVID-19. He has recovered and has been discharged from hospital, after being admitted for treatment for nearly two weeks including three days in the intensive care unit (ICU).

Election results

Honours

Honours of Malaysia
  :
  Knight Commander of the Order of the Crown of Selangor (DPMS) – Dato' (1994)
  :
  Grand Knight of the Order of the Crown of Pahang (SIMP) – formerly Dato', now Dato' Indera (1998)
  Grand Knight of the Order of Sultan Ahmad Shah of Pahang (SSAP) – Dato' Sri (2008)
  :
  Knight Grand Commander of the Order of the Life of the Crown of Kelantan (SJMK) – Dato' (2000)
  :
  Knight Grand Commander of the Order of the Crown of Perlis (SPMP) – Dato' Seri (2014)
  :
  Grand Commander of the Exalted Order of Malacca (DGSM) – Datuk Seri (2015)

See also
Budget Select Committee (Malaysia)
Jeli (federal constituency)
Air Lanas (state constituency)

References

External links
 

1950 births
Living people
People from Kelantan
Malaysian people of Malay descent
Malaysian Muslims
Malaysian economists
Malaysian United Indigenous Party politicians
Former United Malays National Organisation politicians
Members of the Dewan Rakyat
Members of the Dewan Negara
Members of the Kelantan State Legislative Assembly
Government ministers of Malaysia
Agriculture ministers of Malaysia
Education ministers of Malaysia
Finance ministers of Malaysia
University of Melbourne alumni
Boston University alumni
21st-century Malaysian politicians